Veggie Galaxy is a diner-style vegetarian restaurant located in the Central Square section of Cambridge, Massachusetts.

The establishment was founded by Adam Penn in 2011 after his first vegetarian restaurant, Veggie Planet in Harvard Square, had operated for more than ten years.  Veggie Galaxy has been credited in Boston Magazine as “the Best of Boston for Vegetarian Restaurants”

The restaurant is inspired by classic diner cuisine, and vegetarian cuisine and serves breakfast, lunch, and dinner. The fact that they don't serve any meat or seafood should be considered a "footnote". Veggie Galaxy is mainly concerned with serving full-flavored, balanced dishes that are pleasing to vegetarians, vegans, and omnivores alike.

History
The diner opened for business on September 5, 2011.

In July 2018, Veggie Galaxy's Portobello Melt sandwich was mentioned in Marvel Comics Astonishing X-Men by the character Beast.

In October 2019, the diner was featured on Food Network's Diners, Drive-Ins and Dives (Season 30, Episode 16), during which host Guy Fieri stated, "This needs to go places. People need to have this in their town."

Media awards
Veggie Galaxy has earned numerous awards and prizes during its eleven years in existence.

Food awards

2020s

2010s

See also
 List of diners
 List of vegetarian restaurants

References

Restaurants in Massachusetts
Restaurants in Cambridge, Massachusetts
Vegetarian restaurants in the United States
Restaurants established in 2011
Diners in Massachusetts
2011 establishments in Massachusetts